Laymon is a surname. Notable people with the surname include:

Kiese Laymon (born 1974), American writer, editor, and professor
Richard Laymon (1947–2001), American author 
Tracie Laymon, American screenwriter, producer, and film director

See also
 Lamon (name)
 Layman (surname)